Pochonia is a genus of fungi within the order Hypocreales and is described as anamorphic Metacordyceps; eight species are described. Previously placed in the genus Verticillium, these fungi are known to be pathogenic to nematodes and are being developed and commercialized as biological pesticides.

The genus name of Pochonia is in honour of Jacques Pochon (1907-1978), who was a French doctor and microbiologist from the Pasteur Institute. 

The genus was circumscribed by Augusto Chaves Batista and Ozório José de Menezes Fonseca in Publ. Inst. Micol. Univ. Recife vol.462 on page 4 in 1965.

Species 
The IndexFungorum records the following species;
 Pochonia bulbillosa 
 Pochonia chlamydosporia 
 Pochonia chlamydosporia var. catenulata 
 Pochonia chlamydosporia var. chlamydosporia 
 Pochonia globispora 
 Pochonia goniodes 
 Pochonia humicola 
 Pochonia microbactrospora 
 Pochonia parasitica 
 Pochonia rubescens 
 Pochonia suchlasporia 
 Pochonia suchlasporia var. catenata 
 Pochonia suchlasporia var. suchlasporia

References

Biopesticides
Parasitic fungi
Clavicipitaceae